The mineral zektzerite is a member of the tuhualite group and was first found in 1966  by Seattle mineralogist Benjamin Bartlett "Bart" Cannon. It was discovered in the Willow creek basin below Silver Star mountain in miarolitic cavities within the alkaline arfvedsonite granite phase of the Golden Horn batholith, Okanogan County, Washington. It is named for Jack Zektzer (born 1936), mathematician and mineral collector of Seattle, Washington.

The mineral was misidentified as alkali beryl (morganite) at that time.

Properties 

Synthesis: by fusion of Li2CO3, Na2CO3, SiO2, ZrO2. The resulting material has a brilliant blue white fluorescence under short wave ultraviolet light.

Occurrence 
Zektzerite is a mineral of agpaitic granites with arfvedsonite. It occurs with smoky quartz, microcline, okanoganite, sogdianite, astrophyllite, and zircon. It is found in cavities as euhedral crystals in the agpaitic-granite phase of the Golden Horn batholith, Okanogan County, Washington. It also occurs in blocks of pegmatite as rock-forming grains in a moraine of the Dara Pioz glacier in northern Tajikistan; in the Del Salto pluton in Aysén Province, Chile;as euhedral crystals at  Virikkollen, Haneholmveien, Sandefjord, Norway;   Ampasibitika, Ampasindava Peninsula, Madagascar; and as gemmy crystals up to 3 cm from Mt. Malosa Malawi.

References 

 Die Seltene Mineralien von Dara-i-Pioz in Hochgebirge Tadshikistans Lapis v. 16(12) p. 42-48 (1991)
 Peralkaline rocks in the late Cretaceous Del Salto pluton Eastern Patagonian Andes Aisen Chile Revista Geologica de Chile v. 29 #1 July 1992 p. 3-15
 Glasser, F. P., Marr J. Synthesis of anhydrous silicates containing double chain anions Si6O15 (6-): Proceedings British Ceramic Society No. 28 p. 73-89 June 1979
Guastoni, Alessandro; Pezzotta, Frederico and Zorzi, Frederico: Neufunde aus Alkali Pegmatiten am Mount Malosa Malawi Lapis 3 (2008) p. 38-41

Lithium minerals
Sodium minerals
Orthorhombic minerals
Minerals in space group 64
Inosilicates